The BC Action Party was a minor political party in British Columbia, Canada. It nominated six candidates in the 2001 British Columbia election. These candidates won 1,718 votes (1.31% of the total in the ridings in which they ran). BCAP candidates ran in ridings in Okanagan, Kelowna and Surrey, and placed last in all six ridings. The party's best showing was in Okanagan Westside, where its candidate won 921 votes (4.4% of the total).  The party was later de-registered by the BC elections commission

A new party with the same name was registered in October 2013 a provincial political party to field candidates in British Columbia provincial elections. It nominated two candidates in the 2017 provincial election, neither of whom was elected. It ran no candidates in the 2020 British Columbia general election.

See also
 List of political parties in British Columbia

References

Action Party
Defunct political parties in Canada
Political parties established in 2001
Action Party